Saint James station is a light rail station operated by Santa Clara Valley Transportation Authority. The station is located in Downtown San Jose, California on 1st and 2nd Streets between Saint James and Saint John Streets. The northbound platform is on 1st Street (the address is 150 N. First Street); the southbound platform is on 2nd Street (the address is 101 N. Second Street). This station is served by the Blue and Green lines of the VTA Light Rail system. The platforms at Saint James station are separated by the western half of the historic St. James Park.

Saint James station was renovated in 2006 to permit level entry at all doors.

Service

Station layout

Notable places nearby 
The station is within walking distance of the following notable places:
San Pedro Square
St. James Park

References

External links 

Santa Clara Valley Transportation Authority light rail stations
Santa Clara Valley Transportation Authority bus stations
Railway stations in San Jose, California
1987 establishments in California
Railway stations in the United States opened in 1987